Hoche is a station of the Paris Métro, serving Line 5.

Location
The station is located in Pantin under Avenue Jean-Lolive at Rue Hoche and Rue du Pré-Saint-Gervais.

History
 The station was opened on 12 October 1942 during the extension of the line to the Eglise de Pantin station. It is located under Avenue Jean-Lolive at the intersection with Rue Hoche to which it owes its name. It pays homage to General Lazare Hoche (1768-1797) who, at the age of 25, commanded the Army of the Moselle with which he drove the Austrians back to Wœrth, cleared Landau and Alsace. The platform in the direction of Bobigny presents in a display case, a bust of Lazare Hoche and images evoking the life of this General of the Revolution.

In 2018 it saw 5,185,130 travelers, which placed it at the 87th position of metro stations for attendance.

For more than ten years until 2018, the name of the station on the walls of the platforms were written in Parisine font on thin plates covering the original names in faience. They were re-continued, a feature that the station shares with Filles du Calvaire on Line 8 and Porte des Lilas on Line 11.

Passenger services

Access
The station has two entrances on both sides of Avenue Jean-Lolive, west of the intersection with Hoche Street.

Station layout

Platforms
Hoche is a standard configuration station with two platforms separated by subway tracks under an elliptical vault. It has white and rounded lighting bands in the Gaudin style of the metro revival of the 2000s and white bevelled ceramic tiles cover the walls, vault, tunnel exits and outlets of the corridors. The platforms are equipped with benches made of slats and the name of the station is inscribed in faience, in the style of the original CMP. It is therefore decorated in a style identical to that applied to most Paris metro stations. Only the advertising frames are special: in brown faience and with simple patterns, they are surmounted by the letter M. These same frames are only present in seven other stations of the Paris metro.

Bus connections
The station is served by Lines 151, 170 and 330 of the RATP Bus Network and by lines N13, N41 and N45 of the Noctilien bus network.

References

Paris Métro stations in Pantin
Railway stations in France opened in 1942